Pogo 1104 is a German television mini-series.

See also
List of German television series

External links
 

1984 German television series debuts
1984 German television series endings
1980s German television miniseries
Nautical television series
Television series about radio
1980s German-language films
German-language television shows
Das Erste original programming